Benjamin H. Jellison (December 29, 1845 - April 5, 1924) was an American soldier who fought in the American Civil War. Jellison received his country's highest award for bravery during combat, the Medal of Honor. Jellison's medal was won for his heroism at the Battle of Gettysburg, Pennsylvania on July 3, 1863. He was honored with the award on December 1, 1864.

Jellison was one of seven soldiers from the 19th Massachusetts Infantry who were awarded the Medal of Honor. He joined the Army in July 1861, and mustered out with his regiment in June 1865. After the civil war, Jellison served in the Massachusetts militia from 1873 to 1893, where he was promoted to captain, having entered the militia as a private.

Jellison died in Reading, Massachusetts on April 5, 1924, and was buried in Haverhill, Massachusetts.

Medal of Honor citation

See also
List of Medal of Honor recipients for the Battle of Gettysburg
List of American Civil War Medal of Honor recipients: G–L

References

1845 births
1924 deaths
American Civil War recipients of the Medal of Honor
People from Newburyport, Massachusetts
People of Massachusetts in the American Civil War
Union Army officers
United States Army Medal of Honor recipients